Sidi Aissa Ben Ali is a town and rural commune in Fquih Ben Salah Province, Béni Mellal-Khénifra, Morocco. At the time of the 2004 census, the commune had a total population of 22,697 people living in 3735 households.

References

Populated places in Fquih Ben Salah Province
Rural communes of Béni Mellal-Khénifra